This is a list of Ambassadors and High Commissioners to and from Barbados as of January 2023.

International organisations

See also
List of Barbados diplomatic posts
Foreign relations of Barbados

References

 

Barbados
Barbados